The central retinal vein (retinal vein) is a vein that drains the retina of the eye. It travels backwards through the centre of the optic nerve accompanied by the central retinal artery before exiting the optic nerve together with the central retinal artery to drain into either the superior ophthalmic vein or the cavernous sinus.

Structure

Origin 
The central retinal vein is formed by the convergence of veins that drain retinal tissue. The central retinal vein originates within the eyeball, emerging from the eyeball already as a single unified vein.

Course 
The central retinal vein runs through the centre of the optic nerve (alongside the central retinal artery) surrounded by a fibrous connective tissue envelope. It leaves the optic nerve 10 mm from the eyeball along with the central retinal artery, also exiting the meningeal envelope of the optic nerve.

Fate 
The central retinal vein drains into either the superior ophthalmic vein or the cavernous sinus.

Variation 
The central retinal vein varies between individuals. in some the central retinal vein drains into the superior ophthalmic vein, and in some it drains directly into the cavernous sinus.

Clinical significance

Central retinal vein occlusion 

The central retinal vein is the venous equivalent of the central retinal artery. Like that blood vessel, it can suffer from occlusion (central retinal vein occlusion). This occlusion is similar to that seen in ocular ischemic syndrome.

Papilledema 
As the fluid surrounding the optic nerve within its meningeal envelope is contiguous with the cerebrospinal fluid of the central nervous system, increased intracranial pressure can cause compression of the central retinal vein where it emerges from the optic nerve (the accompanying artery is meanwhile less susceptible to compression due to its thicker arterial wall), with the resulting venous congestion causing oedema of the optic nerve (papilledema).

Additional images

References

External links 
Early Signs Of Eye Defects

Veins of the head and neck